Migidio Bourifa (born 31 January 1969 at Casablanca) is an Italian long-distance runner who specializes in the marathon races.

Biography
He formerly competed for Morocco. He finished tenth in the marathon at the 2002 European Championships. In addition he placed lowly at the 2003 World Championships and did not finish at the 2005 World Championships.

At the 1997 Half Marathon World Championships in Košice, he finished 52nd. In 1998 he finished seventh in the overall standings at the Turin Marathon and was the first Italian to do so, but he was tested positive for Amineptin during a doping test so that he was disqualified and his Italian championship title was revoked. The two-year doping ban, which was actually due, was reduced to eight months by the national federation because of "cooperative behavior".

Achievements

Personal bests
5000 metres - 13:51.79 min (1993)
10,000 metres -  28:43.5 min (2012)          
Half marathon - 1:02:35 hrs (2000)
Marathon - 2:09:07 hrs (2002)

References

External links
 

1969 births
Living people
Italian male long-distance runners
Italian male marathon runners
Italian sportspeople of African descent
Moroccan emigrants to Italy
Sportspeople from Casablanca
Naturalised citizens of Italy
World Athletics Championships athletes for Italy